{{DISPLAYTITLE:C7H11NO3}}
The molecular formula C7H11NO3 (molar mass: 157.167 g/mol, exact mass: 157.0739 u) may refer to:

 Ethadione
 Furanomycin
 Paramethadione

Molecular formulas